1126 Otero, provisional designation , is a rare-type Florian asteroid from the inner regions of the asteroid belt, approximately 10 kilometers in diameter. It was discovered on 11 January 1929, by German astronomer Karl Reinmuth at Heidelberg Observatory in southwest Germany. It was named after Spanish courtesan Carolina Otero.

Classification and orbit 

Otero is a member of the Flora family, one of the largest families of stony asteroids in the main belt. It orbits the Sun in the inner main-belt at a distance of 1.9–2.6 AU once every 3 years and 5 months (1,251 days). Its orbit has an eccentricity of 0.15 and an inclination of 7° with respect to the ecliptic.

Physical parameters 

In the SMASS classification, Otero is a rare A-type asteroid.

Lightcurves 

Two rotational lightcurve of Otero were obtained from photometric observations by astronomers Petr Pravec and Robert Stepens in February 2008. Lightcurve analysis gave a concurring, well-defined rotation period of 3.648 hours with a brightness variation of 0.69 and 0.70 magnitude, respectively.

Diameter and albedo 

According to the survey carried out by NASA's Wide-field Infrared Survey Explorer with its subsequent NEOWISE mission, Otero measures 8.87 and 10.974 kilometers in diameter and its surface has an albedo of 0.37 and 0.399, respectively. The Collaborative Asteroid Lightcurve Link derives an albedo of 0.1994 and a diameter of 11.74 kilometers with an absolute magnitude of 12.098 from Petr Pravec's revised WISE-data.

Naming 

This minor planet was named by the discoverer for Galician-born Spanish courtesan, dancer and actress Carolina Otero (1868–1965), who was also known as "La Belle Otero". During the Belle Époque, she was the most sought after woman in all of Europe and led an excessive life thanks to her numerous rich and famous lovers. The official naming citation was first published by the Astronomical Calculation Institute.

Notes

References

External links 
 Asteroid Lightcurve Database (LCDB), query form (info )
 Dictionary of Minor Planet Names, Google books
 Asteroids and comets rotation curves, CdR – Observatoire de Genève, Raoul Behrend
 Discovery Circumstances: Numbered Minor Planets (1)-(5000) – Minor Planet Center
 
 

001126
Discoveries by Karl Wilhelm Reinmuth
Named minor planets
001126
19290111